The Pan Celtic Festival (branded simply using the Irish name ) is a Celtic-language music festival held annually in the week following Easter, in Ireland, since its inauguration in 1971. The first Pan Celtic Festival took place in Killarney, County Kerry, Ireland. Its aim is to promote the modern Celtic languages and cultures and artists from six Celtic nations: Brittany, Cornwall, Ireland (Republic of Ireland and Northern Ireland compete as a single entity), Isle of Man, Scotland and Wales.

Each participating nation holds its own national selection event to choose its representatives at the Festival. The most successful nation is Wales with fourteen wins, with Ireland in second having won eleven times. Bénjad, who represented Cornwall in 2012 and 2013, became the first artist in the festival's history to have won twice. The Isle of Man is the least successful nation, having only won once in 2014.

Origins and history 

Formed in Killarney, County Kerry, Ireland, the Pan Celtic Festival was organised as a music festival to be held every Spring, to promote the modern cultures and Celtic languages through the medium of music. It was originally entitled Gŵyl Gerdd Bach (Welsh for "Small Music Festival"), by Con O'Connaill, but later changed to its current name. In May 1971, the first festival took place in Killarney; and featured performers from Wales (Phyllis and Meredydd Evans), Ireland (Scoil na Toirbhirte), and Brittany (Les Tregerez Group and Alan Stivell).

Meredydd Evans engaged in discussions with the event organiser, Ó Connaill, following the 1971 Festival, and invited him to the National Eisteddfod of Wales. At the Eisteddfod, Ó Connaill met members from other Celtic nations, and formed a committee for the Pan Celtic Festival. Participants from the six Celtic nations of Brittany (Breizh), Cornwall (Kernow), Wales (Cymru), Scotland (Alba), Ireland (Éire) and the Isle of Man (Mannin) took part in the second Pan Celtic Festival, again held in Killarney in 1972. It was during this festival that the core structure of the event was finalised following a meeting with committee members. These principles of the event are to promote the languages, musical talents and cultures within the six territories recognised as Celtic nations.

Participation

Eligibility to compete at the Pan Celtic Festival is for Celtic nations, which are territories in Northern and Western Europe where Celtic languages or cultural traits have survived, and are members of the Celtic League. The term "nation" is used in its original sense to mean a community of people who share a common identity and culture and are identified with a traditional territory. It is not synonymous with "sovereign state".

National selections

Brittany: Gouelioù Etrekeltiek An Oriant

The Gouelioù Etrekeltiek An Orient (or ) is an annual Celtic festival, located in the city of Lorient, Brittany, France. The event also acts as a national selection process to determine the Breton representative for the annual Pan Celtic Festival. It was founded in 1971 by Polig Montjarret. This annual festival takes place every August and is dedicated to the cultural traditions of the Celtic nations (pays celtes in Brittany), highlighting celtic music and dance and also including other arts such as painting, photography, theatre, sculpture, traditional artisan as well as sport and gastronomy.

Cornwall: Kan Rag Kernow

Kan Rag Kernow is a Cornish annual song contest to find a representative for Cornwall at the Pan Celtic Festival, held annually in Ireland. The Cornish group, The Changing Room, won the 2015 Kan Rag Kernow on 30 January 2015. The group went on to represent Cornwall at the 2015 Pan Celtic Festival, finishing in first place with the song "Hal an Tow" (Flora Day).

Ireland: Comórtas Amhrán Náisiúnta

The Comórtas Amhrán Náisiúnta is the Irish selection process to determine the representatives for Ireland at the annual Pan Celtic Festival. In 2015, the selection show was held at the Seven Oaks Hotel, in Carlow, on 7 March.

Isle of Man: Arrane son Mannin

The Arrane son Mannin is the Manx competition through which a song is selected for the Pan Celtic Festival. In 2015, Shenn Scoill, a quartet whose name means "Old School", were chosen to represent the island.

Scotland: Am Mòd Nàiseanta Rìoghail

Am Mòd Nàiseanta Rìoghail is the Scottish Gaelic selection process, organised by An Comunn Gàidhealach, to find the Scottish representative for the Pan Celtic Festival, held annually in Ireland. The Scottish band, Na h-Òganaich, were the first representatives for Scotland at the 1971 Pan Celtic Festival. They represented Scotland again in 1972, with the song "Mi le m’Uillin", finishing in first place.

Wales: Cân i Gymru

Cân i Gymru is a Welsh television show broadcast on S4C annually. It was first introduced in 1969 when BBC Cymru wanted to enter the Eurovision Song Contest. It has taken place every year since, except in 1973. Cân i Gymru is different from most talent shows; whereas the majority invite the public to participate, Cân i Gymru welcomes only professional artists. The winner of the contest represents Wales at the annual Pan Celtic Festival held in Ireland and is also awarded a cash prize.

Wales made their debut participation in the Eurovision Choir of the Year 2017, which marked the second time in any of the Eurovision Family of Events that the country was not represented as part of the unified state of the United Kingdom, after 1994, when Wales participated lastly in the Jeux Sans Frontières. Wales used the talent show Côr Cymru, to select their representatives.

Festival hosts

The festivals, since 1971, have been held in various towns and cities in Ireland. Below is a list of the host cities and their respective years of hosting. The 2001 festival was cancelled due to the foot-and-mouth outbreak. As is shown below, County Kerry have hosted the festival twenty-nine times since 1971, with the most recent the 2011 Festival, in the town of Dingle, who first hosted the event in 2010. County Clare have only hosted once in 1997.

List of winners

By festival
The table below lists all of the annual Pan Celtic Festival winners since its inaugural event in 1971.

By Celtic nation

The table below lists all of the Pan Celtic Festival winners by Celtic Nations, since its inaugural event in 1971. Wales is the most successful nation to date, with fifteen wins; with Ireland coming in second with eleven wins. The Isle of Man achieved their one and only win to date in 2014.

See also 

 ABU Radio Song Festival
 ABU TV Song Festival
 Bundesvision Song Contest
 Cân i Gymru
 Caribbean Song Festival
 Eurovision Song Contest
 Intervision Song Contest
 Junior Eurovision Song Contest
 Sopot International Song Festival
 Turkvision Song Contest

References

External links
Official site

Celtic festivals
Inter-Celtic organisations
Music festivals in Ireland
Folk festivals in Ireland
Celtic music festivals